2015 in Korea may refer to:
2015 in North Korea
2015 in South Korea